is a Japanese manga series written by Shinji Makari and illustrated by Akana Shu, serialized in Kodansha's Afternoon magazine from 1994 to 2004. The series transferred to Kodansha's Evening magazine wherein the subtitle "the Negotiator" is added in. Subsequent compilations of the original manga also add this phrase.

The manga was adapted into an anime television series in 2004 as Yugo the Negotiator. The anime comprises the manga's first two major arcs, which fit within 13 episodes. The series follows Yugo Beppu, a hostage negotiator, in various cases around the world. Having both a very tough body and determination, and his keen insight, Yugo often goes to great length to rescue those he was asked to.

Plot

Media

Manga
Yugo, written by Shinji Makari and illustrated by Shuu Akana, was serialized in Kodansha's Monthly Afternoon magazine between 1994 and 2004. The chapters were compiled into 22 tankōbon volumes and published in the Kodansha's Afternoon KC line between June 23, 1994, and September 22, 2004. From 2004 it started to be published as Yugo the Negotiator in Evening. The first volume was published on September 22, 2004, in the Evening KC line, with subsequent volumes published in the KC Delux line.

Anime
First announced in November 2003, a 13-episode anime adaptation titled  was created. G&G Direction produced the Pakistan Chapter with Seiji Kishi as director, and Kazuharu Sato as writer. Artland produced the Russia Chapter with Shinya Hanai as director and Kenichi Kanemaki as writer. It was originally broadcast between February 24, and March 25, 2004, on Kids Station. Six DVD volumes were released from May 25, to October 29, 2004, by Ken Media.

ADV Films licensed the series for a North American release in March 2005, releasing the first volume in both a regular edition and an edition with a box on July 26. After releasing the last volume on March 21, 2006, ADV released the complete series in a DVD box set on October 2, 2007, and on March 24, 2009. The first three episodes of Yugo the Negotiator were screened at the Barbican Centre on February 26, 2008, in London; Helen McCarthy, an anime expert, did an introduction of the show for the audience.

Reception

Anime News Network's Theron Martin elected Yugo the "Best New Hero/Heroine" along with Kei Kurono of Gantz and Pacifica of Scrapped Princess. Martin declared he is "the most original hero: he deals with 'opponents' though his attention to understanding them and the sometimes-extreme actions he undertakes so that he can negotiate with them on their terms. A very slick, and very tough, individual."

See also
 Master Keaton

References

External links 
 

1994 manga
2004 anime television series debuts
ADV Films
Artland (company)
Kodansha manga
Political thriller anime and manga
Seinen manga